Veľký Biel is a village and municipality in western Slovakia in  Senec District in the Bratislava Region.

Etymology
The name comes from Slavic beľ (bělь): whiteness, "glistening place" - mud, swam (compare i.e. with Old Polish biel or Russian biľ /dialect/).  1294 Beel, 1335 Magyarbel (hu: "Hungarian Bel"), now Veľký Biel.  1323 Minor Beel, 1335 Nemethbel (hu: "German Bel"), now Malý Biel - a part of Veľký Bieľ.

History
In historical records the village was first mentioned in 1209.

Geography
The municipality lies at an altitude of 131 metres and covers an area of 10.161 km². It has a population of 2303 people.

References

External links/Sources

 Official page
https://web.archive.org/web/20070513023228/http://www.statistics.sk/mosmis/eng/run.html

Villages and municipalities in Senec District